Meseritz may refer to:

 Kreis Meseritz, a historical administrative subdivision of Posen District
 German name for Międzyrzec Podlaski, a city in Lublin Voivodeship, Poland
 Meserich Synagogue, New York
 German name for Międzyrzecz, a town in Lubusz Voivodeship, Poland
 the medieval terra Meseritz south of Gützkow, Western Pomerania, now Jarmen
 Dov Ber of Meseritz